Paltothemis cyanosoma, also known as the blue rock skimmer, is a species of skimmer in the family Libellulidae. It is endemic to Mexico, where it is found in Guerrero, Jalisco, and Michoacán.

References

Libellulidae
Insects described in 1982